There are at least 2340 named lakes and reservoirs in Arkansas. The following list contains lists of lakes and reservoirs in Arkansas by county.

A lake is a terrain feature (or physical feature), a body of liquid on the surface of a world that is localized to the bottom of basin (another type of landform or terrain feature; that is not global). Another definition is a body of fresh or salt water of considerable size that is surrounded by land. On Earth a body of water is considered a lake when it is inland, not part of the ocean, is larger and deeper than a pond.

A reservoir (etymology from French réservoir a "storehouse ) is an artificial lake used to store water. Reservoirs may be created in river valleys by the construction of a dam or may be built by excavation in the ground or by conventional construction techniques such a brickwork or cast concrete.

Major lakes/reservoirs

List of lakes by county
 List of lakes of Arkansas County, Arkansas
 List of lakes of Ashley County, Arkansas
 List of lakes of Baxter County, Arkansas
 List of lakes of Benton County, Arkansas
 List of lakes of Boone County, Arkansas
 List of lakes of Bradley County, Arkansas
 List of lakes of Calhoun County, Arkansas
 List of lakes of Carroll County, Arkansas
 List of lakes of Chicot County, Arkansas
 List of lakes of Clark County, Arkansas
 List of lakes of Clay County, Arkansas
 List of lakes of Cleburne County, Arkansas
 List of lakes of Cleveland County, Arkansas
 List of lakes of Columbia County, Arkansas
 List of lakes of Conway County, Arkansas
 List of lakes of Craighead County, Arkansas
 List of lakes of Crawford County, Arkansas
 List of lakes of Crittenden County, Arkansas
 List of lakes of Cross County, Arkansas
 List of lakes of Dallas County, Arkansas
 List of lakes of Desha County, Arkansas
 List of lakes of Drew County, Arkansas
 List of lakes of Faulkner County, Arkansas
 List of lakes of Franklin County, Arkansas
 List of lakes of Fulton County, Arkansas
 List of lakes of Garland County, Arkansas
 List of lakes of Grant County, Arkansas
 List of lakes of Greene County, Arkansas
 List of lakes of Hempstead County, Arkansas
 List of lakes of Hot Spring County, Arkansas
 List of lakes of Howard County, Arkansas
 List of lakes of Independence County, Arkansas
 List of lakes of Izard County, Arkansas
 List of lakes of Jackson County, Arkansas
 List of lakes of Jefferson County, Arkansas
 List of lakes of Johnson County, Arkansas
 List of lakes of Lafayette County, Arkansas
 List of lakes of Lawrence County, Arkansas
 List of lakes of Lee County, Arkansas
 List of lakes of Lincoln County, Arkansas
 List of lakes of Little River County, Arkansas
 List of lakes of Logan County, Arkansas
 List of lakes of Lonoke County, Arkansas
 List of lakes of Madison County, Arkansas
 List of lakes of Marion County, Arkansas
 List of lakes of Miller County, Arkansas
 List of lakes of Mississippi County, Arkansas
 List of lakes of Monroe County, Arkansas
 List of lakes of Montgomery County, Arkansas
 List of lakes of Nevada County, Arkansas
 List of lakes of Newton County, Arkansas
 List of lakes of Ouachita County, Arkansas
 List of lakes of Perry County, Arkansas
 List of lakes of Phillips County, Arkansas
 List of lakes of Pike County, Arkansas
 List of lakes of Poinsett County, Arkansas
 List of lakes of Polk County, Arkansas
 List of lakes of Pope County, Arkansas
 List of lakes of Prairie County, Arkansas
 List of lakes of Pulaski County, Arkansas
 List of lakes of Randolph County, Arkansas
 List of lakes of Saline County, Arkansas
 List of lakes of Scott County, Arkansas
 List of lakes of Searcy County, Arkansas
 List of lakes of Sebastian County, Arkansas
 List of lakes of Sevier County, Arkansas
 List of lakes of Sharp County, Arkansas
 List of lakes of St. Francis County, Arkansas
 List of lakes of Stone County, Arkansas
 List of lakes of Union County, Arkansas
 List of lakes of Van Buren County, Arkansas
 List of lakes of Washington County, Arkansas
 List of lakes of White County, Arkansas
 List of lakes of Woodruff County, Arkansas
 List of lakes of Yell County, Arkansas

References

Lakes
Arkansas